Thirunallur may refer to one of several villages in India:

 Thirunallur, Annavasal, Pudukkottai
 Thirunallur, Aranthangi, Pudukkottai
 Thirunallur, Thanjavur